Sahibzada Mohammad Ashfaq Khan Afridi (born 25 October 1987 in Karachi, Sindh), known as Ashfaq Afridi, is a Pakistani cricketer.

Early life
Afridi belongs to a family of Sufi pirs (teachers or spiritual masters) and his grandfather Maulana Muhammad Ilyas was a well-known spiritual figure in Bhutan Sharif, a locality in the Tirah Valley. His other grandfather, Sahibzada Abdul Baqi, was given the title Ghazi-e-Kashmir (conqueror of Kashmir) for his efforts during the Indo-Pakistani War of 1947–1948. His brother Shahid Afridi, is a former captain of the Pakistani cricket team. Another brother, Tariq Afridi, played List A and First-class cricket.

Domestic career
Afridi played his only first-class match for Karachi Blues against Abbottabad during the 2008–09 Quaid-e-Azam Trophy. In the first innings, Afridi scored 38 (37) and got figures of 0/39 (5 overs). In the second innings, Afridi scored 3 (9) and didn't bowl. Abbottabad won the match by 10 wickets.

References

External links
 
 Ashfaq Afridi at Pakistan Cricket Board

1987 births
Afridi people
Living people
Pakistani cricketers
People from Karachi
Karachi Blues cricketers